The following outline is provided as an overview of and topical guide to Kazakhstan:

The Republic of Kazakhstan is a landlocked sovereign country located across both Central Asia and Eastern Europe.  Ranked as the ninth largest country in the world as well as the world's largest landlocked country, it has a territory of 2,727,300 km² (greater than Western Europe). It is bordered by Russia, Kyrgyzstan, Turkmenistan, Uzbekistan and China. The country also borders on a significant part of the Caspian Sea.

Vast in size, the land in Kazakhstan is very diverse in types of terrain: flatlands, steppes, taigas, rock-canyons, hills, deltas, mountains, snow-capped mountains, and deserts. Kazakhstan has the 62nd largest population in the world, with a population density of less than 6 people per square kilometre (15 per sq. mi.).

Kazakhstan declared itself an independent country on December 16, 1991, the last Soviet republic to do so. Its communist-era leader, Nursultan Nazarbayev, became the country's new president. Since independence, Kazakhstan has pursued a balanced foreign policy and worked to develop its economy, especially its hydrocarbon industry. While the country's economic outlook is improving, President Nazarbayev maintains strict control over the country's politics. Several opposition leaders and journalists have been killed in recent years, and Western observers generally do not consider Kazakhstan's elections to be free and fair. Nevertheless, Kazakhstan's international prestige is building. It is now considered to be the dominant state in Central Asia. The country belongs to many international organizations, including the United Nations, NATO's Partnership for Peace, the Commonwealth of Independent States, and the Shanghai Cooperation Organisation. In 2010, Kazakhstan will chair the Organization for Security and Cooperation in Europe. In 2011, it formed a customs union with Russia and Belarus.

Kazakhstan is ethnically and culturally diverse, in part due to the mass deportations of many ethnic groups to the country during Stalin's rule. Kazakhs are the largest group, followed by Russians. Kazakhstan allows freedom of religion, and many different beliefs are represented in the country. Islam is the primary religion, followed by Orthodox Christianity. The official language is Kazakh, though Russian is still commonly and most widely used for everyday communication.

General reference 

 Pronunciation:
 Common English country name:  Kazakhstan
 Official English country name:  The Republic of Kazakhstan
 Adjectives: Kazakhstani, Kazakh
 Demonym(s):
 Etymology: Name of Kazakhstan
 International rankings of Kazakhstan
 ISO country codes:  KZ, KAZ, 398
 ISO region codes:  See ISO 3166-2:KZ
 Internet country code top-level domain:  .kz

Geography of Kazakhstan 

Geography of Kazakhstan
 Kazakhstan is: a landlocked country
 Location:
 Kazakhstan is a region or subregion of:
 Northern Hemisphere and Eastern Hemisphere
 Eurasia
 Asia
 Central Asia
 Europe
 Eastern Europe (a small portion only; 381,567 km2)
 Time zones:
 Eastern Kazakhstan Time UTC+6
 Western Kazakhstan Time UTC+5
 Extreme points of Kazakhstan
 High:  Khan Tengri 
 Low:  Caspian Depression 
 Land boundaries:  12,185 km
 6,846 km
 2,203 km
 1,533 km
 1,224 km
 379 km
 Coastline:  none
 Population of Kazakhstan: 18,177,700  – 62nd most populous country

 Area of Kazakhstan: 2,724,900 km2
 Atlas of Kazakhstan

Environment of Kazakhstan 

Environment of Kazakhstan
 Climate of Kazakhstan
 Environmental issues in Kazakhstan
 Renewable energy in Kazakhstan
 Protected areas of Kazakhstan
 National parks of Kazakhstan
 Wildlife of Kazakhstan
 Fauna of Kazakhstan
 Birds of Kazakhstan
 Mammals of Kazakhstan

Natural geographic features of Kazakhstan 

 Islands of Kazakhstan
 Lakes of Kazakhstan
 Rivers of Kazakhstan
 List of World Heritage Sites in Kazakhstan

Regions of Kazakhstan

Administrative divisions of Kazakhstan 

Administrative divisions of Kazakhstan
 Provinces of Kazakhstan
 Districts of Kazakhstan

Provinces of Kazakhstan 

Provinces of Kazakhstan

Notes:
 (1) Almaty and Nur-Sultan cities have the status of State importance and do not relate to any province.
 (2) Baikonur city has a special status because it is currently being leased to Russia with Baikonur cosmodrome through the year 2050.

Districts of Kazakhstan 

Districts of Kazakhstan

Municipalities of Kazakhstan 

Municipalities of Kazakhstan
 Capital of Kazakhstan: Capital of Kazakhstan
 Cities of Kazakhstan

Demography of Kazakhstan 

Demographics of Kazakhstan

Government and politics of Kazakhstan 

Politics of Kazakhstan
 Form of government: presidential republic
 Capital of Kazakhstan: Capital of Kazakhstan
 Elections in Kazakhstan
 Political parties in Kazakhstan
 Taxation in Kazakhstan

Branches of the government of Kazakhstan 

Government of Kazakhstan

Executive branch of the government of Kazakhstan 
 Head of state: Nursultan Nazarbayev, President of Kazakhstan
 Head of government: Karim Masimov, Prime Minister of Kazakhstan

Legislative branch of the government of Kazakhstan 

 Parliament of Kazakhstan (bicameral)
 Upper house: Senate of Kazakhstan
 Lower house: Mazhilis

Judicial branch of the government of Kazakhstan 

Court system of Kazakhstan
 Supreme Court of Kazakhstan

Foreign relations of Kazakhstan 

Foreign relations of Kazakhstan
 Diplomatic missions in Kazakhstan
 Diplomatic missions of Kazakhstan

International organization membership 
The Republic of Kazakhstan is a member of:

Asian Development Bank (ADB)
Collective Security Treaty Organization (CSTO)
Commonwealth of Independent States (CIS)
Economic Cooperation Organization (ECO)
Eurasian Economic Community (EAEC)
Euro-Atlantic Partnership Council (EAPC)
European Bank for Reconstruction and Development (EBRD)
Food and Agriculture Organization (FAO)
General Confederation of Trade Unions (GCTU)
International Atomic Energy Agency (IAEA)
International Bank for Reconstruction and Development (IBRD)
International Civil Aviation Organization (ICAO)
International Criminal Police Organization (Interpol)
International Development Association (IDA)
International Federation of Red Cross and Red Crescent Societies (IFRCS)
International Finance Corporation (IFC)
International Fund for Agricultural Development (IFAD)
International Labour Organization (ILO)
International Maritime Organization (IMO)
International Monetary Fund (IMF)
International Olympic Committee (IOC)
International Organization for Migration (IOM)
International Organization for Standardization (ISO)
International Red Cross and Red Crescent Movement (ICRM)
International Telecommunication Union (ITU)

International Telecommunications Satellite Organization (ITSO)
Inter-Parliamentary Union (IPU)
Islamic Development Bank (IDB)
Multilateral Investment Guarantee Agency (MIGA)
Nonaligned Movement (NAM) (observer)
Nuclear Suppliers Group (NSG)
Organisation of Islamic Cooperation (OIC)
Organization for Security and Cooperation in Europe (OSCE)
Organisation for the Prohibition of Chemical Weapons (OPCW)
Organization of American States (OAS) (observer)
Partnership for Peace (PFP)
Shanghai Cooperation Organisation (SCO)
United Nations (UN)
United Nations Conference on Trade and Development (UNCTAD)
United Nations Educational, Scientific, and Cultural Organization (UNESCO)
United Nations Industrial Development Organization (UNIDO)
Universal Postal Union (UPU)
World Confederation of Labour (WCL)
World Customs Organization (WCO)
World Federation of Trade Unions (WFTU)
World Health Organization (WHO)
World Intellectual Property Organization (WIPO)
World Meteorological Organization (WMO)
World Tourism Organization (UNWTO)
World Trade Organization (WTO) (observer)

Law and order in Kazakhstan 

Law of Kazakhstan
 Constitution of Kazakhstan
 Human rights in Kazakhstan
 LGBT rights in Kazakhstan
 Freedom of religion in Kazakhstan
 Law enforcement in Kazakhstan

Military of Kazakhstan 

Military of Kazakhstan
 Command
 Commander-in-chief:
 Forces
 Army of Kazakhstan
  Navy of Kazakhstan
 Air Force of Kazakhstan

History of Kazakhstan 

History of Kazakhstan

Culture of Kazakhstan 

Culture of Kazakhstan
 Cuisine of Kazakhstan
 Languages of Kazakhstan
 Media in Kazakhstan
 National symbols of Kazakhstan
 Coat of arms of Kazakhstan
 Flag of Kazakhstan
 National anthem of Kazakhstan
 People of Kazakhstan
 Kazakhs
 Russians in Kazakhstan
 Ukrainians in Kazakhstan
 Germans of Kazakhstan
 Armenians in Kazakhstan
 Greeks in Kazakhstan
 Kazakh Jews
 Prostitution in Kazakhstan
 Public holidays in Kazakhstan
 Religion in Kazakhstan
 Buddhism in Kazakhstan
 Christianity in Kazakhstan
 Hinduism in Kazakhstan
 Islam in Kazakhstan
 Judaism in Kazakhstan
 List of World Heritage Sites in Kazakhstan

Art in Kazakhstan 
 Cinema of Kazakhstan
 Literature of Kazakhstan
 Music of Kazakhstan
 Television in Kazakhstan

Sports in Kazakhstan 

Sports in Kazakhstan
 Football in Kazakhstan
Kazakhstan at the Olympics

Economy and infrastructure of Kazakhstan 

Economy of Kazakhstan
 Economic rank, by nominal GDP (2007): 55th (fifty-fifth)
 Agriculture in Kazakhstan
 Banking in Kazakhstan
 National Bank of Kazakhstan
 Communications in Kazakhstan
 Internet in Kazakhstan
 Companies of Kazakhstan
Currency of Kazakhstan: Tenge
ISO 4217: KZT
 Energy in Kazakhstan
 Energy policy of Kazakhstan
 Health care in Kazakhstan
 Mining in Kazakhstan
 Kazakhstan Stock Exchange
 Tourism in Kazakhstan
 Transport in Kazakhstan
 Airports in Kazakhstan
 Rail transport in Kazakhstan
 Roads in Kazakhstan

Education in Kazakhstan 

Education in Kazakhstan

Health in Kazakhstan 

Health in Kazakhstan

See also 

Kazakhstan
Index of Kazakhstan-related articles
List of Kazakhstan-related topics
List of international rankings
Member states of the United Nations
Outline of Asia
Outline of geography

References

External links 

 Government of Kazakhstan
 President of the Republic of Kazakhstan
 Atlas of Kazakhstan
 BBC News Country Profiles – Kazakhstan
 CIA World Factbook – Kazakhstan
 U.S. Department of State – Kazakhstan includes links to various reports
 
 The World Bank – Kazakhstan development issues
 Library of Congress – A Country Study: Kazakhstan last updated March 1996
 Kazakhstan: Humanitarian Country Profile – UN Office for the Coordination of Humanitarian Affairs
 

Kazakhstan